Toronto Township may refer to:

Canada 

Toronto Township, Ontario, now part of Mississauga

United States 

Toronto Township, Woodson County, Kansas

Township name disambiguation pages